The Lincoln Capitols were a professional indoor football team that played their home games at Pershing Auditorium in Lincoln, Nebraska, United States.  They originally planned on becoming the Nebraska Knockout, but the name was scrapped.  From 1999 to 2000, they were the Lincoln Lightning of the original Indoor Football League before the IFL was bought out.  The Lightning then played in the Arena Football's farm league during the 2001 season, before leaving the league and joining the National Indoor Football League as the Capitols. During their four-year run, the franchise's most prominent player was a former Nebraska Cornhusker running back named Damon Benning and the franchise's owner was Andrew Cheesman. In 2005 through 2006 they had 3 standout players, Nate Jacks from Atlanta, Ga, a graduate from Clinton High School, Mike Carrawell from St. Louis, MO and Brian Guthrie from National City,CA (San Jose State)The trio with Coach Chris Simpson, brought the key players in to play many roles. Brian Guthrie came in as a DB/LB/RB and later played for the Wyoming Cavalry (2007-2008). Mike was an All-American slot receiver from Quincy University and Nate was a shutdown corner back from KU.

This team in Lincoln has been a pushover for most of the team's history, despite being successful in the regular season. They are the only team to lose in two shutouts, a rarity in the NIFL.

The league, hoping to kill off their APFL competition and make the Capitols better, talked with the St. Joseph Explorers of the APFL and interested them in merging with the Lincoln Capitols and becoming the St. Joseph Storm. The team was still bad and was later bought by the league and made a traveling team.  The end result was prospective owners saw NIFL as a league to avoid which was a major factor in the league's problems in 2007.

Season-By-Season 

|-
| colspan="6" align="center" | Lincoln Lightning (IFL)
|-
|1999 || 7 || 5 || 0 || 1st Southern || Lost Semifinal (Green Bay)
|-
|2000 || 10 || 4 || 0 || 2nd Southern || Lost Round 1 (Sioux City)
|-
| colspan="6" align="center" | Lincoln Lightning (af2)
|-
|2001 || 6 || 10 || 0 || 7th NC Midwestern || --
|-
| colspan="6" align="center" | Lincoln Capitols (NIFL)
|-
|2002 || 10 || 4 || 0 || 1st Pacific Northern || Lost Round 1 (Billings 54, Lincoln 51)
|-
|2003 || 9 || 5 || 0 || 2nd Pacific Northern || --
|-
|2004 || 3 || 11 || 0 || 4th Pacific Northern || --
|-
|2005 || 1 || 13 || 0 || 5th Pacific Western || --
|-
| colspan="6" align="center" | Lincoln Capitols/St. Joseph Explorers
|-
|2006 || 0 || 14 || 0 || 3rd Pacific Western || --
|-
!Totals || 46 || 69 || 0
|colspan="2"| (including playoffs)
|}

References

External links
 Lincoln Lightning on ArenaFan.com

 https://web.archive.org/web/20160303182802/http://www.wyomingcavalry.com/stats/WYO623.HTM
 http://www.oursportscentral.com/services/releases/?id=3159363

American football teams in Nebraska
Defunct af2 teams
Indoor Football League (1999–2000) teams
National Indoor Football League teams
Sports in Lincoln, Nebraska
American football teams established in 1998
American football teams disestablished in 2006
1998 establishments in Nebraska
2006 disestablishments in Nebraska